Fountas & Pinnell reading levels (commonly referred to as "Fountas & Pinnell") are a proprietary system of reading levels developed by Irene Fountas and Gay Su Pinnell and published by Heinemann to support their Levelled Literacy Interventions (LLI) series of student readers and teacher resource products.  In its marketing material, Heinemann refers to its text levelling system by the trademark F&P Text Level Gradient.

Overview 
In this system, reading text is classified according to various parameters, such as word count, number of different words, number of high-frequency words, sentence length, sentence complexity, word repetitions, illustration support, etc. While classification is guided by these parameters, syllable type, an important consideration in beginning reading, is not considered as part of the leveling system. Small books containing a combination of text and illustrations are then provided to educators for each level. 

While young children display a wide distribution of reading skills, each level is tentatively associated with a school grade. Some schools adopt target reading levels for their pupils. This is the grade-level equivalence chart recommended by Fountas & Pinnell.

Alternative classifications of reading difficulties have been developed by various authors (Reading Recovery levels, DRA levels, Basal Levels, Lexile Levels, etc.).

Criticism 

Criticism of LLI and the Fountas and Pinnell reading levels have focused on three main issues: the amount and sequencing of phonics instruction in the series; the research evidence for the program's effectiveness; and the program's underlying model of reading.

Research Evidence 

Psychologist David A Kilpatrick writes that, as of 2015, "there have been no research studies on LLI published in peer-reviewed journals."

In a 2018 presentation to the US Reading League, psychologist Steve Dykstra questions Fountas & Pinnell's marketing claims to "gold-standard" research.

Underlying Model of Reading 

In a position statement, Learning Difficulties Australia states that it does not support "the literacy approaches developed by Fountas and Pinnell, including Levelled Literacy Intervention and Guided Reading" because they are "programs that follow a whole language or ‘balanced literacy’ approach." Instead, LDA endorses programs that are examples of an "explicit structured approach to the teaching of reading [...] consistent with the scientific evidence as to how children learn to read and how best to teach them."

Kilpatrick criticises the program's basis in the three cueing systems model, "which focuses heavily on contextual guessing and therefore does not promote sight-word acquisition. The three-cueing system has significant disadvantages for weak readers."

Ontario Human Rights Commission 
The Ontario Human Rights Commission created a giant meta-report "Right to Read: public inquiry into human rights issues affecting students with reading disabilities", has in part 8 "Curriculum and instruction" devoted to criticizing whole language systems, cueing systems, and also specifically Fountas & Pinnell's balanced literacy in sections titled "Ineffective methods for teaching reading" and "Balanced Literacy".

The section on Balanced Literacy iterates "balanced literacy" as a term is deceptive, and its claims of scientific approaches are meritless. It continues to say balanced literacy is also especially harmful for at-risk students while failing all students in general.

Notes 

Literacy
Reading (process)
Readability tests